"Do Me Again" is a number-one R&B single by Freddie Jackson and the second single from the title album. Released in January 1991, the song spent one week at number one on the US R&B chart and was the last of ten singles to reach the top spot.

See also
List of number-one R&B singles of 1991 (U.S.)

References

1991 singles
1991 songs
Freddie Jackson songs
Songs written by Paul Laurence